Lady Mary Pelham was launched in 1811 as a packet based in Falmouth, Cornwall for the Post Office Packet Service. She repelled attack by privateers in 1812 and 1813, the latter being a notable and controversial engagement with an American privateer. Another American privateer captured her in February 1815 in the West Indies. New owners retained her name and between 1815 and at least 1824 she continued to sail to the Continent and South America.

Packet
Lloyd's Register (LR) started carrying the Falmouth packets in 1812 and that is when Lady Mary Pelham first appeared in it.

James A. Stevens was appointed captain on 4 March 1811. On 14 October 1812 Lady Mary Pelham Packet repelled an attack off Cape Pallas by a privateer of 14 guns and 75 men. The privateer had earlier captured a vessel from Gibraltar returning there from Cagliari and armed with 10 guns. Lady Mary Pelham arrived at Falmouth on 5 December, having sailed from Malta on 7 November and Gibraltar on the 29th.

During the engagement, Captain Norway, the surgeon, and two seamen were killed on Montague; 11 seamen were wounded. Lady Mary Pelham had two men wounded, one of them being Perring. There were conflicting accounts of the engagement, one denigrating Perring as a lawyer whose sole experience had been sailing a yacht, and Lady Mary Pelhams contribution to the engagement being too little too late. The matter came up in Parliament where documents were table showing that a second court of inquiry had exonerated Captain Perring and acknowledged that Lady Mary Pelham{'}s intervention had saved Montague from capture and had eventually succeeded in driving Globe off. 

After the engagement Globe put into Grand Canary in a highly damaged state. She had had 33 men killed, 19 wounded, and five captured in attempts to board Montague.

Captain James Graham assumed command of Lady Mary Pelham on 21 June 1814.

Capture 
Captain Graham sailed from Falmouth on 20 November 1814 and arrived at Suriname in January 1815. Lady Mary Pelham sailed from Suriname to Barbados, and then to Antigua, leaving Antigua on 1 February.

The Baltimore privateer Kemp, Jose Joaquim Almeida, master, captured Lady Mary Pelham on 9 February 1815. Graham and seven of his men had been wounded, and two men killed before she struck. Kemp had one man killed and three wounded in the 40 minute action. Kemp was armed with six guns and had a crew of 135 men; Lady Mary Pelham was armed with 10 guns and had a complement of 42 men, including five passengers. Almeida sold his crew $632.75 worth of clothes taken from Lady Mary Pelham. The sum then became part of the prize account.  Kemp sent her into Wilmington, North Carolina where she was libeled on 31 March 1815 and condemned.

American merchantman
Lady Mary Pelham was sold in Wilmington, with new owners retaining the name.

Lady Mary Pelham, Sanders, master, a packet brig from Wilmington, North Carolina, discharged at Gibraltar on 5 June. Captain Sanders also sailed her between the US and Buenos Aires. In 1818, with Gillander, master, she was reported to have come into New York from Havana.

On 14 April 1818 The  ran down and sank Noma (Numa), of Baltimore, returning there in ballast from Amsterdam. The master and the crew were taken aboard the frigate, which took them to Bordeaux. Lady Mary Pelham, Schouyler, brought the mate and steward into New York from Bordeaux. Néréides commander was capitaine de vaisseau Boutouillic de La Villegonan and the incident occurred above the Azores. Néréide had been sailing from Martinique to Brest, France via Guadeloupe. 

On 14 June at  two armed vessels flying Spanish colours, believed to be from Havana on their way to Corruna fired on Lady Mary Pelham. Captain Schoyler, believing that the only way to account for such behavior was that war had been declared between Spain and America, struck. He went aboard one of the vessels and the other sent an officer aboard Lady Mary Pelham. After it was established that no state of war existed, the Spaniards released her. She arrived at New York on 22 July.<ref>"Extract from the Logbook of the Bring Lady Mary Pelham, Arrived Yesterday from Bordeaux." National Advocate (New York, New York), 23 July 1818.</ref>

On 24 January 1824, Lady Mary Pelham'', of New York, Langdon, master, put into Charleston. She was 23 days out of Campechey, on her way to Gibraltar. She resumed her voyage. Later that year she was reported to be at Buenos Aires. That is the last mention of her in the press.

Notes, citations, and references
Notes

Citations

References
 
 
 
 
 
 
 

1811 ships
Age of Sail merchant ships of England
Falmouth Packets
Captured ships
Age of Sail merchant ships of the United States